Luserna San Giovanni (Occitan: Luzerna e San Jan, Piedmontese: Luserna e San Gioann, French: Lucerne Saint-Jean) is a comune (municipality) in the Metropolitan City of Turin in the Italian region Piedmont, located in the Val Pellice about  southwest of Turin.

Luserna San Giovanni borders the following municipalities: Angrogna, Bricherasio, Torre Pellice, Bibiana, Lusernetta, Rorà, and Bagnolo Piemonte.

History
Until a merger in 1872, San Giovanni and Luserna were separate villages. Caffarel, an Italian chocolate conglomerate, was founded in the area in 1826.

Twin towns — sister cities
Luserna San Giovanni is twinned with:

  Prievidza, Slovakia 
  Savines-le-Lac, France
  Colonia Valdense, Uruguay

References

External links
 Official website